Badminton contested at the 2007 Summer Universiade from August 7 to August 9 at the Thammasat University in Pathum Thani, Thailand. Men's and women's singles, men's, women's, and mixed doubles, and mixed team events was contested.

Medal summary

Medal table

Events

References

2007 Summer Universiade
2007
Universiade